Inspire is the second studio album by Australian recording artist Jack Vidgen, also the winner of the fifth season of Australia's Got Talent.

It was released on 27 April 2012. Vidgen's voice had also broken in the time between his debut album and Inspire, making it sound noticeably deeper.

Track listing

Charts

References

2012 albums
Jack Vidgen albums